Ian Donald MacLeod (May 19, 1945 – October 23, 2022) was a Canadian football player who played for the Edmonton Eskimos. He previously played football for the Edmonton Huskies and was a native of Edmonton. MacLeod died on October 23, 2022, at the age of 77.

References

1945 births
2022 deaths
Edmonton Elks players
Players of Canadian football from Alberta
Canadian football people from Edmonton